Jim Ellis may refer to:

Jim Ellis (jockey) (1910–1971), New Zealand jockey and racehorse trainer
Jim Ellis (baseball) (born 1945), former Major League Baseball pitcher
Jim Ellis (swimming coach) (born 1948), American swim coach and subject of the film Pride
Jim Ellis (computing) (1956–2001), American computer scientist
Jim Ellis (lobbyist) (fl. 2000), American Republican activist
Jim Ellis (King County activist) (1921–2019), American civic activist

See also
James Ellis (disambiguation)
Jimmy Ellis (disambiguation)